Shrek the Halls is an American Christmas computer-animated comedy television special that premiered on the American television network ABC
on November 28, 2007. The thirty minute Christmas special was co-written and directed by Gary Trousdale and produced by DreamWorks Animation. Mike Myers, Eddie Murphy, Cameron Diaz, and Antonio Banderas reprise their roles from the feature films. This Christmas special takes place between Shrek the Third and Shrek Forever After. As with the other Shrek animations, this television special was based on the 1990 children's book Shrek! by William Steig.

Plot 
Shrek is quietly living in the swamp with his family when the Christmas season arrives. Under Donkey's urging, Shrek reluctantly promises Princess Fiona a special Christmas surprise. Shrek goes to the local bookstore in Far Far Away to try to find a present for Fiona, but since he does not know what Christmas is all about, the shopkeeper gives Shrek a copy of Christmas For Village Idiots, a step by step guide to celebrating the holiday. Shrek proceeds to follow the book's advice by decorating the house and getting a tree so he can spend a quiet Christmas Eve with his family, but Donkey brings the entire "family" to the swamp, spoiling Shrek's plans.

As Shrek tries to recite "A Visit from St. Nicholas", Donkey, Puss in Boots, and Gingy interrupt and each tell their own Christmas story. Donkey tells of a Christmas parade passing by the swamp and licking an enormous waffle Santa, and absentmindedly starts licking Shrek's foot. Puss's version of the Santa Claus story ends with playing with the tassel on Santa's hat, while in reality he is playing with a bauble. Gingy tells a horrifying story about how his girlfriend Suzy was eaten by Santa Claus. Donkey calls it ridiculous, and finds Shrek's Christmas for Village Idiots book. A fight breaks out over the book and Shrek's supper is destroyed. After lighting his butt on fire, Shrek finally loses his temper and ends up ejecting his friends from his house, including Donkey, who denounces him as "Ebenezer Shrek" in the heat of the argument. With their Christmas spirit ruined, Fiona is upset at Shrek's behavior and leaves with the ogre triplets. She catches up to their friends and explains to Donkey what Shrek had wanted for Christmas.

Shrek, remorseful at what he has done, catches up with the group and apologizes for lashing out at them earlier. He then tells everyone this is also his first Christmas, since ogres do not celebrate anything. They return to the swamp and Shrek tells his own version of "The Night Before Christmas", featuring himself as "Ogre Claus". Soon, they hear bells and go outside to see Santa and his reindeer, although Gingy is still afraid of Santa and runs back inside in fear. The special ends with Santa using his magic to put ogre ears on the moon.

Cast
 Mike Myers as Shrek
 Eddie Murphy as Donkey
 Cameron Diaz as Princess Fiona
 Antonio Banderas as Puss in Boots
 Conrad Vernon as Gingy
 Cody Cameron as Pinocchio and The Three Little Pigs
 Aron Warner as Big Bad Wolf
 Christopher Knights as Three Blind Mice
 Miles Christopher Bakshi, Nina Zoe Bakshi, and Dante James Hauser as Farkle, Fergus, & Felicia
 Marissa Jaret Winokur as Bookstore Clerk
 Gary Trousdale as Santa Claus

Production
Shrek the Halls was produced by DreamWorks Animation and PDI/DreamWorks. David Ian Salter and Mark Baldo directed the special during the pre production, but they were later replaced by Gary Trousdale. The film was produced by Teresa Cheng, Gina Shay and Aron Warner and was written by Bill Riling, Theresa Cullen, Gary Trousdale and Sean Bishop.

Release

Broadcast
Shrek the Halls premiered on the American television network ABC on November 28, 2007, in which they hold the exclusive domestic rights to the special until 2023; when it expires, the rights to Shrek the Halls are scheduled under NBC's full control for 2024.

In the UK, it premiered on December 24, 2007, on BBC One. The special was repeated on BBC Three on December 23, 2011, along with Shrek: Once Upon a Time and Shrek.

Ratings
The rating info is courtesy of Your Entertainment Now and ABC Medianet.

United States Nielsen ratings

United Kingdom Figures

* 6.32 million (BBC One viewers) + 0.60 million (BBC Three viewers) = 6.92. Both shown at the same time.

Home media 
Shrek the Halls was released on DVD in the United States on November 4, 2008. It grossed $15.9 million in home sales. Originally the special was available by itself, or in a bundle pack with Shrek the Third. The special was released on iTunes on November 2, 2008 and on Blu-ray and DVD on October 30, 2012, as part of compilation titled Dreamworks Holiday Classics. The special was re-released on DVD on October 1, 2013 along with Merry Madagascar, Kung Fu Panda Holiday, Dragons: Gift of the Night Fury, and The Croods.  DreamWorks Holiday Classics, available on Amazon, features Donkey's Caroling Christmas-tacular and does not feature Shrek the Halls.

HarperFestival also published a picture book version of Shrek the Halls, authored by Catherine Hapka and illustrated by Michael Koelsch. Koelsch had previously illustrated a picture book for Shrek 2 in 2004.

Music
The score of the special was composed by Harry Gregson-Williams. The special, like the films, also features the following Pop culture and Christmas songs:

 "Summer Breeze"
 "Jingle Bells" (sung by Eddie Murphy)
 "Here We Come A-wassailing" (sung by I'm from Barcelona)
 "Because We Can"
 "Jingo (Gin Go La Ba)"
 "Ride of the Valkyries"
 "The Twelve Days of Christmas"
 "Santa Claus is Comin' to Town"
 "O Fortuna"
 "Christmas Wrapping"
 "Gonna Make You Sweat (Everybody Dance Now)"
 "Don't Stop Believin'"
 "Hello Ma Baby"
 "Hallelujah Chorus"
 "Deck the Halls"
 "The Stars Shine in the Sky Tonight"

ICE!
In July 2011, as part of a strategic partnership between DreamWorks Animation and Gaylord Hotels, Shrek the Halls was presented as the theme of the ICE! exhibit at Gaylord's hotels in Texas and Florida. In this presentation, the plot of the film is told through a series of ice sculptures that visitors walk past.

See also
 List of Christmas films
 Santa Claus in film

References

External links

 
 

2007 television specials
Shrek mass media
2000s American television specials
DreamWorks Animation animated short films
American Broadcasting Company television specials
Christmas television specials
2000s American animated films
Films scored by Harry Gregson-Williams
Films directed by Gary Trousdale
Films with screenplays by Gary Trousdale
American Christmas television specials
2000s animated television specials
Animated Christmas television specials
2007 films